Founded by Mike Lewis, Lewis Recordings is an underground record label that currently has eight artists signed to it. It is primarily a Hip Hop/Rap label, and arguably its biggest artist is Edan, who has released two full-length albums to date under the label. It was founded in Belsize Park, north London, England, and is now based in Clerkenwell, central London.

The label has produced an Audio CD collection by various artists.

Artists
 Edan
 Dagha
 Andrew Thompson
 Dooley-O
 Mighty Casey
 Cinnamon
 Kerogen
 Stig of the Dump
 Julian Fane
 Skinshape

References

External links
 Official website
 Feature on Lewis Recordings in Huck Magazine
 Lewis Recordings on UKHH.com
 Lewis Recordings on Last.fm

Record labels established in 2001
British record labels
Companies based in the London Borough of Islington
Media and communications in the London Borough of Islington